María José Oyarzún Solis (23 October 1980) is a Chilean teacher who was elected as a member of the Chilean Constitutional Convention.

References

External links
 
 BCN Profile

Living people
21st-century Chilean politicians
Democratic Revolution politicians
Members of the Chilean Constitutional Convention
University of Valparaíso alumni
People from Aysén Region
21st-century Chilean women politicians
1982 births